Ivanpah may refer to:

Cities and communities
 Ivanpah, California, an unincorporated community in the Mojave National Preserve
 Ivanpah (ghost town), California, on the slope of Clark Mountain, approximately 20 miles from present-day Ivanpah, CA
 Ivanpah, Kansas, an unincorporated community in Greenwood County

Mojave Desert places
 Ivanpah Valley, between the New York Mountains and Ivanpah Mountains
 Ivanpah Mountains, in the southeastern Mojave Desert
 Ivanpah Lake, a dry bed lake in the Ivanpah Valley
 Ivanpah Solar Power Facility, a 392-MW concentrated solar thermal plant
 Ivanpah Valley Airport, a planned relief airport for McCarran International Airport (LAS), approximately 5 miles SW of Jean Airport